One 2 Ka 4 is a 2001 Indian Hindi language action drama film directed by Shashilal K. Nair. The film stars Shah Rukh Khan, Juhi Chawla and Jackie Shroff. The score and soundtrack were composed by A. R. Rahman. This film is now owned by Shah Rukh Khan's Red Chillies Entertainment.

Plot
The story is about two friends and cops, Javed Abbas and Arun Verma, who are both Special Task Force officers and partners. Javed is a widower who is bringing up his 4 children with a lot of love and effort while Arun is his carefree, hotheaded, trigger-happy albeit well-meaning subordinate and brother-like friend. Arun doesn't like Javed's four children, just like he doesn't like any kid, nor do the four children like him. KKV is a local drug lord that the entire police department have always been desperate to bring him to justice. But due to KKV's broad connection in the police department, nobody ever manages to find any solid proof against him.

With the help of an informer, police catch KKV's group red handed while he is dealing drugs. But later someone replaces the drugs detained from KKV with sugar, making KKV released, which makes it very clear that someone in the police department is working for KKV. The Police Commissioner is eager to find out that traitor.

Geeta is Javed's friend. Once she meets Arun, and falls in love with him at the first sight, but Arun shows no special interest in her and always avoids her.

While on a subsequent drug raid, Javed is shot dead by an unknown assailant. Before the mission, Javed wrote a letter to Arun, asking Arun to take care of his four kids if he does not survive. As Javed's best friend, in spite of not liking kids, Arun decides to adopt Javed's children, instead of sending them to an orphanage. Arun also engages with Geeta so that he can have her helping him taking care of those children. Arun also develops his feeling for Geeta gradually. Arun's life becomes difficult as his salary is not enough to support so many people.

In a visit to KKV's club to warn him, Arun unexpectedly finds that Geeta is the dancer at that club. Arun becomes angry with Geeta, not only because he thinks bar dancer is a filthy job, but also because he thinks Geeta has long been cheating him by pretending to be decent. When he returns home later, he confronts Geeta and questions her for that, but the children all say that Geeta was with them all the day, making Arun have to believe that the bar dancer is another person that simply looks like Geeta.

Under the pressure of living, Arun robs KKV. He takes a big amount of money from KKV, which he knew was dirty money, and buys a big house for his family. Arun gets arrested immediately, not for the robbery, but however for illegal drug possession. He is charged with being KKV's spy as police identifies that the drugs found in his house belongs to KKV. Obviously, Arun is trapped by someone, but he does not know who trapped him. In the court. Geeta also testifies against Arun, however, not as his fiancee, but as a secret police officer who worked at KKV's bar—yes, the bar dancer whom Arun saw before—and the witness of Arun's robbery. Arun is therefore suspended from duty until further trial.

Arun now does not believe anyone anymore, he decides to find the killer of Javed and the spy for KKV by his own. He questions a police officer at his home, whom he believes to be corrupted. The officer admits he is a spy for KKV, but follows the order of JD, another police officer. He also says he does not know who killed Javed, but JD does. Arun kills him and heads for JD's house.

On his way to JD's house, Arun calls Geeta for help, who was with the Police Commissioner when answering the phone call. With the permission of the Commissioner, Geeta joins Arun to question JD, only to find JD was killed right before they arrive. They believe the Police Commissioner is the spy as he is the only third person that knows they are heading for JD.

Arun rushes to the Police Commissioner's house and thrashes him, but the latter denies being a spy for KKV. Geeta goes to CBI Chief's house to report the situation, who is the superior of the Police Commissioner, but she finds KKV is in the Chief's house with him, making her immediately realize the Chief is the real spy as he might have known the plan from the Commissioner. The Chief and KKV try to kill Geeta, but she manages to escape.

Geeta visits Arun and the Commissioner and tells them her findings about the Chief. The Commissioner is shocked to know that, and he knows that the Chief is going to leave the country very soon. They arrive at the airport to stop the Chief from leaving. During the gunfight at the airport, KKV kills the Chief when taking him as a hostage and inspector Sawant kills KKV and gets killed by Arun and Sawant also reveals himself as the killer of Javed at the final scene, as he was always belittled by the latter and Javed gets all the credits and honors despite Sawant's hard work and dedication. Arun is later praised by his department and gets his job back.

Cast
Shah Rukh Khan as ACP Arun Verma
Juhi Chawla as Geeta Chaudhury
Jackie Shroff as SSP Javed Abbas
Nirmal Pandey as Krishan Kant Virmani (KKV)
Dilip Joshi as Champak
Rajendranath Zutshi as Sawant
Akash Khurana as Police Commissioner
Keith Stevenson as CBI Chief
Sahila Chadha as Bipasha
Suresh Chatwal as Inspector Rajendra
Madhur Mittal as Michael
Fatima Sana Shaikh
 M. Rehman Naushad Ali as Broker
Jack Gaud as Shetty
 Bharat Dabholkar as J.D.

Soundtrack 

A. R. Rahman composed the soundtrack of the film, and lyrics were written by Majrooh Sultanpuri and Mehboob.

Reception

Box office 
It is the 21st-highest-grossing film of 2001 worldwide.

India

It opened on Friday, 30 March 2001, across 260 screens, and earned  nett on its opening day. It grossed  nett in its opening weekend, and had a first week of  nett. The film earned a total of  nett, and was declared "Below Average" by Box Office India. It is the 20th-highest-grossing film of 2001 in India.

Overseas
It had an opening weekend of $275,000 (1.27 crore) and went on to gross $375,000 (1.74 crore) in its first week. The film earned a total of $565,000 (2.62 crore) at the end of its theatrical run. Overseas, It is the 12th-highest-grossing film of 2001.

Critical response
Taran Adarsh of IndiaFM gave the film 1 out of 5 stars, writing "On the whole, ONE 2 KA 4 is handicapped by a weak script, despite plus factors it has to its credit (SRK's presence, A.R. Rahman's music, vibrant action). The film has precious little to offer in terms of substance, which will curtail its prospects to a major extent. Disappointing!" Nidhi Taparia of Rediff.com wrote: "Burdened by a sloppy screenplay and script, Shah Rukh looks jaded and very bored. The cop role just doesn't cut any new slack. For an actor of his calibre, one wonders what forces were at work here for him to actually sign on for the film.
Juhi in her sexy moll avatar could give any of the teenaged starlets a run for their money and is understated and just hits the right note. But her village belle get-up, now that's something I'd rather not delve into. Suffice to say that here's an instant recipe for headache. As for the rest of the cast, the less said the better. One 2 Ka 4 has no punches to pull."

References

External links
 

2001 films
2000s Hindi-language films
Films scored by A. R. Rahman
Indian action thriller films
2001 action thriller films
Films shot in Malaysia
Fictional portrayals of the Maharashtra Police